Cymindis humeralis is a species of ground beetle in the subfamily Harpalinae. It was described by Geoffory in 1785.

Description

Distribution
This species is present in most of Europe (Austria, Belarus, Bosnia and Herzegovina, Bulgaria, Czech Republic, Denmark, Estonia, France, Germany, Hungary, Italy, Latvia, Macedonia, Netherlands, Poland, Portugal, Romania, Russia, Slovakia, Spain, Ukraine) and in the East Palearctic ecozone.

Habitat
This xerophilous ground beetle lives in calcareous grasslands, heathlands and in the edges of forests.

References

humeralis
Beetles described in 1785